NGC 7069 is a lenticular galaxy located about 400 million light-years away in the constellation of Aquarius. NGC 7069 is also classified as a LINER galaxy. NGC 7069 was discovered by astronomer Albert Marth on October 12, 1863.

See also 
 NGC 7033

References

External links 
 

Lenticular galaxies
Aquarius (constellation)
7069
66807
Astronomical objects discovered in 1863
11747
LINER galaxies